Hellbound is a fifth studio album by Brazilian death/thrash metal act Torture Squad, released on April 25, 2008 by Wacken Records.

Background
In 2007, the band is presented in German festival, Wacken Open Air to play in Metal Battle. With a phenomenal performance convincing the audience and the jury of Metal Battle. The result was victory, that culminated a recording contract with the Wacken Records (formerly called Armageddon Music) for the release of a studio album.

Track listing

Personnel
Vitor Rodrigues – vocals
Maurício Nogueira – guitar
Castor – bass
Amílcar Christófaro – drums

References

2008 albums
Torture Squad albums